Andrea Colli (born 15 June 1966) is an Italian academic. He is a Professor of Business History, Head of Department of Social and Political sciences at Bocconi University. He is the author of several books.

Early life
Andrea Colli was born 15 June 1966. He graduated from Bocconi University, where he also earned a PhD in Economic and Social History.

Career
Colli is a Professor of Business History, Head of Department of Social and Political sciences at his alma mater, Bocconi University. He was a visiting professor at the Lancaster University Management School.

Works

References

Living people
1966 births
Bocconi University alumni
Academic staff of Bocconi University
Business historians